A fluxion is a mathematical concept, first formulated by Isaac Newton.

Fluxion may also refer to:

 Newton's method for solving an equation
 Method of Fluxions, Newton's book on differential calculus
 An alternate spelling of fluxon, a quantum of magnetic flux
 Fluxion (electronic musician), real name Konstantinos Soublis
 Fluxion (album), The Ocean Collective's first LP